Donald Efiong Udo Ekong (31 December 1933 – 2005) was a Nigerian professor of Chemistry and the founding Vice Chancellor of the University of the Gambia and was also the vice Chancellor of the university of Port Harcourt of from the year 1977 - 1982.There is a library named after him at the University of Port Harcourt, Nigeria in the honour of his extensive work for the country, both in teaching and research as well as in university management and development of higher education.

References

1933 births
2005 deaths
Nigerian chemists
Academic staff of the University of the Gambia
Fellows of the African Academy of Sciences
Founder Fellows of the African Academy of Sciences